Muqui may refer to

 Muki (Lima), also spelled Muqui, a mountain in the Lima Region, Peru
 Muki (mythology), also spelled Mooqui or Muqui, a mythological figure in the Andes
 Muqui District, a district in Peru
 Muqui, Espírito Santo, a municipality in the state of Espírito Santo
 Muqui River, a river in the state of rondônia, Brazil